Lophozia longidens is a species of liverwort belonging to the family Lophoziaceae.
Synonym:
 Lophozia longidens subsp. longidens

References

Jungermanniales